Chris Reifert (born February 23, 1968) is an American death metal musician, and one of the pioneers of the death/doom genre. Although his music is more death metal than doom metal, he is one of the first musicians that blended the two styles. He played drums on the Death debut album, Scream Bloody Gore. Since he parted ways with Chuck Schuldiner in 1987 after Schuldiner moved back to Florida, Reifert decided to stay in the San Francisco Bay Area, and in 1987 he formed his own band, Autopsy. In this band, he played not only drums but handled the vocals as well. After several albums, Autopsy split up in 1995 and Reifert and bandmate Danny Coralles began playing in their side-project, Abscess, full-time. After Abscess dissolved in 2010, Autopsy reformed and is currently planning to tour and record new material.

Chris Reifert is also known for his many side-projects, including the Ravenous, Doomed, Eat My Fuk, and Violation Wound. He has also performed guest vocals on Machetazo's Sinfonias del Terror Ciego and the Autopsy-inspired Murder Squad's Ravenous, Murderous, with further guest appearances for Immortal Fate, Nuclear Death, and "Cathedral of the Damned" on Cathedral's final album, The Last Spire. He is also known for his album cover art. His interviews are noted for his sharp wit and off-the-wall humor.

Bands
 Burnt Offering – ( Drums )
 Death – drums
 Autopsy – drums, vocals, bass
 Abscess – drums, vocals, bass
 The Ravenous – drums, guitar, vocals
 Eat My Fuk – drums, vocals
 Doomed – drums
 Violation Wound – guitar, vocals
 Painted Doll – drums, guitar, bass

Discography

Burnt Offering
 Demo 1 (1985)
 Frightmare (1985)

Death

 Mutilation (1986)
 Scream Bloody Gore (1987)

Autopsy

 1987 Demo (1987)
 Critical Madness (1988)
 Severed Survival (1989)
 Retribution for the Dead (1991)
 Mental Funeral (1991)
 Fiend for Blood (1992)
 Acts of the Unspeakable (1992)
 Shitfun (1995)
 Ridden with Disease (2000)
 Torn from the Grave (2001)
 Dead as Fuck (2004)
 Horrific Obsession (2009)
 The Tomb Within (2010)
 Macabre Eternal (2011)
 All Tomorrow's Funerals (2012)
 The Headless Ritual (2013)
 Tourniquets, Hacksaws & Graves (2014)
 Skull Grinder (2015)

Doomed
 Haematomania (1991)
 Broken (1993)

Abscess

 Abscess (1994)
 Raw, Sick, and Brutal Noize (1994)
 Crawled Up from the Sewer (1995)
 Filthy Fucking Freaks (1995)
 Urine Junkies (1995)
 Seminal Vampires and Maggot Men (1996)
 Open Wound (1998)
 Throbbing Black Werebeast (1998)
 Tormented (2000)
 Split with Deranged (2001)
 Split with Machetazo (2001)
 Through the Cracks of Death (2002)
 Thirst for Blood, Hunger for Flesh (2004)
 Damned and Mummified (2004)
 Split with Bloodred Bacteria (2005)
 Horrorhammer (2007)
 Split with Bonesaw (2008)
 Dawn of Inhumanity (2010)

The Ravenous
 Assembled in Blasphemy (2000)
 Three on a Meathook (2002)
 Blood Delirium (2004)

Eat My Fuk
 Wet Slit and a Bottle of Whiskey (2003)
 Fuk You, It's Eat My Fuk! (2009)

Violation Wound
 Violation Wound (2014)
 Broken Idol/Elimination Time (2015)
 Open Up And Burn (2016)
 With Man In Charge (2018)

Painted Doll
 Painted Doll (2018)
 How to Draw Fire (2020)

Cathedral
 The Last Spire (2013), backing vocals on track "Cathedral Of The Damned"

Bloodbath
 Grand Morbid Funeral (2014), backing vocals on track "Grand Morbid Funeral"

Teitanblood
 Death (2014), vocals on track "Burning in Damnation Fires"

Morbosidad
 Tortura (2014), vocals on track "Batalla de pecados"

Filmography
 Autopsy – Dark Crusades (2006)
 Death - Death by Metal'' (2016)

References

Death metal musicians
1968 births
Living people
American male singers
Death (metal band) members
American heavy metal drummers
American heavy metal singers
20th-century American drummers
American male drummers
20th-century American male musicians